Jim Hill (1890 in Indianapolis, Indiana – ?) was an American racecar driver.

Career statistics

By season

Indianapolis 500 results

References

External links
 

1890 births
Year of death missing
Indianapolis 500 drivers
Racing drivers from Indianapolis